Chandra Prakash Pant ((); born 28 November 1987) is a Nepalese director and action director known from his work in Nepali and Bhojpuri language films. He started his career as a stuntman in 2008 and professionally as an action director in 2012 in the film Raavan. He was national player in taekwondo, boxing, and gymnastics. Chandra is most awarded action director of Nepal and he achieved 5th dan black belt level in taekwondo and teaches it in New York.

Early life 
Chandra Pant is the son of Omkar Pant and Dhana Devi Pant was born on 28 November 1987 at Mahendranagar Kanchanpur, Nepal. He did his schooling on Modern Montessori English Boarding School, up to class 5 and MahendraNagar Higher Secondary School, Mahendranager from Class 6. He studied there up to class 10 and went South India for further studies. He did his higher secondary from Andra Loyola College, Andhra Pradesh on science faculty. After his high schooling, he went to Kathmandu for MBBS studies. His love towards sports and the movie industry pushed him to join the film industry as in stuntman.

Filmography

National awards and nominations

References

External links

1987 births
Living people
Nepalese film directors
Nepalese male taekwondo practitioners
Stunt performers
People from Kanchanpur District